UFC Fight Night: Volkov vs. Struve (also known as UFC Fight Night 115) was a mixed martial arts event produced by the Ultimate Fighting Championship held on September 2, 2017 at Rotterdam Ahoy in Rotterdam, Netherlands.

Background
A heavyweight bout between former Bellator Heavyweight Champion Alexander Volkov and Stefan Struve headlined the event.

Promotional newcomer Abu Azaitar was expected to face Siyar Bahadurzada at the event, but pulled out in early August and was replaced by fellow newcomer Rob Wilkinson.

Also in early August, Islam Makhachev pulled out of a scheduled bout against Michel Prazeres and was replaced by another newcomer in Mads Burnell.

On August 11, Marcos Rogério de Lima was pulled from his bout against Saparbek Safarov after being flagged by the U.S. Anti-Doping Agency (USADA) for a potential anti-doping violation stemming from an out-of-competition sample collected on August 1. Subsequently, Safarov was also forced from the card with a rib injury.

Nick Hein was expected to face promotional newcomer Zabit Magomedsharipov at this event, but pulled out on August 21 due to injury. Hein was replaced by promotional newcomer Mike Santiago .

Former UFC Women's Featherweight Champion Germaine de Randamie was expected to face Marion Reneau at the event. However, de Randamie pulled out of the fight on August 25 citing injury. She was replaced by promotional newcomer Talita Bernardo.

At the weigh ins, Michel Prazeres missed the lightweight limit of 156 pounds, coming in at 159 pounds. As a result his bout with Mads Burnell was changed to a catchweight and Prazeres was fined 20% of his purse.

Results

Bonus awards
The following fighters were awarded $50,000 bonuses:
Fight of the Night: Alexander Volkov vs. Stefan Struve 
 Performance of the Night:  Mairbek Taisumov and Zabit Magomedsharipov

See also
List of UFC events
2017 in UFC

References

UFC Fight Night
2017 in mixed martial arts
Sports competitions in Rotterdam
2017 in Dutch sport
September 2017 sports events in Europe
Mixed martial arts in the Netherlands